Iain Angus McLeod Paxton (born 29 December 1957) is a Scottish former rugby union player. He won 36 caps for Scotland at number eight and lock between 1981 and 1988, scoring a total of five tries. He also won four caps for the British Lions against New Zealand in 1983.

Playing career

Selkirk
Paxton's old playing club was Selkirk.

Scotland
Paxton made his Scotland debut against New Zealand All Blacks on the 1981 tour and later that year he helped Scotland to a memorable 24-15 win over Australia at Murrayfield. He was also a key figure in Scotland’s 1984 Grand Slam winning side, playing in all matches, relegating John Beattie to the bench. 

When he finished his career in 1988, Paxton was Scotland's most capped No. 8 with 36 caps.

British Lions
Paxton was a member of the 1983 British Lions tour to New Zealand and played in all four internationals for the Lions.

Playing attributes
Richard Bath writes of him that:
"Against Wales in particular, Paxton was in superb form, scoring one of the greatest tries ever scored at Cardiff Arms Park as Scotland beat Wales at home for the first time since 1962."

Coaching career
Paxton began his coaching career at Glenrothes RFC then moved to Boroughmuir, during which time the Meggetland outfit have lifted the SRU Cup twice (2000 and 2001) and taken the league title once (2002–03 season).
He then went on to Coach the Scotland Under 21 team achieving a notable away victory over England. He went on to be appointed as forwards coach for Edinburgh Rugby. He returned to Club rugby with his old club Selkirk as Youth Development Manager In 2016, he was appointed as Director Of Rugby at Boroughmuir.

References
 Bath, Richard (ed.) The Complete Book of Rugby (Seven Oaks Ltd, 1997 )

External links
Paxton's passion can see Scots second string become future force - The Scotsman, 6 March 2005

1957 births
Living people
Scottish rugby union players
Scotland international rugby union players
British & Irish Lions rugby union players from Scotland
Rugby union number eights
Rugby union locks
Scottish rugby union coaches
Boroughmuir RFC players
People educated at Beath High School
Place of birth missing (living people)
Glenrothes RFC players